"Freakin' It" is a song by American rapper Will Smith. It was released as the third and final single from his second studio album, Willennium. The single was released on March 22, 2000. The song was written and composed by Smith with a selection of other songwriters, including those of the Diana Ross chart single "Love Hangover," whose fast-paced bassline it samples, and was produced by two of those others, "Trackmasters" Samuel Barnes  and Lennie Bennett. The single peaked at number 15 on the UK Singles Chart.

Music video
The music video for "Freakin' It" premiered in February 2000, at a total length of four minutes and thirteen seconds. The video was later added to Smith's official Vevo account on March 24, 2011. The video features Smith performing the selection on a series of streets in Philadelphia in wintry conditions, as he paid homage to his hometown. (Smith is a native of the West Philadelphia neighborhood of Overbrook, after which he has named his production company.)

Track listing
 UK CD #1
 "Freakin' It" – 3:59
 "Holla Back" – 4:19
 "Gettin' Jiggy wit It" (New Video Mix) – 3:48

 UK CD #2
 "Freakin' It" (Trackmasters House Mix) – 5:32
 "Candy" (featuring Cameo) – 3:56
 "Just The Two of Us" (Rodney Jerkins Remix) (featuring Brian McKnight) – 5:16

 UK Cassette
 "Freakin' It" – 3:59
 "Holla Back" – 4:19

 European single CD
 "Freakin' It" – 3:59
 "So Fresh" – 3:36

 European Maxi-CD
 "Freakin' It" – 3:59
 "Holla Back" – 4:19
 "Freakin' It" (Trackmasters House Mix) – 5:32
 "Freakin' It" (Trackmasters House Instrumental) – 5:32

 America
 "Freakin' It" – 3:59
 "Freakin' It" (instrumental) – 3:59
 "Freakin' It" (a cappella) – 3:59
 "Freakin' It" (Trackmasters House Mix) – 5:32
 "Freakin' It" (Trackmasters House Instrumental) – 5:32
 "Pump Me Up" – 4:05 (Performed by DJ Jazzy Jeff & The Fresh Prince)

Charts

References

1999 songs
2000 singles
Will Smith songs
Columbia Records singles
Songs written by Nile Rodgers
Songs written by Jean-Claude Olivier
Songs written by Samuel Barnes (songwriter)
Songs written by Pam Sawyer
Songs written by Bernard Edwards
Songs written by Marilyn McLeod
Music videos directed by Paul Hunter (director)